Spiezer Schilling or Spiezer Chronik is a chronicle by Diebold Schilling the Elder of Bern (1480s), created after the Berner Schilling by the same author.

See also 
 Swiss illustrated chronicles

References

External links 

 Digital scans on e-codices

Swiss illustrated chronicles